1st Baron Redesdale may refer to:
 John Freeman-Mitford, 1st Baron Redesdale, of the creation of 1802
 Algernon Freeman-Mitford, 1st Baron Redesdale, of the creation of 1902